The Alliance A-1 Argo was an American-built two-seat biplane of the late 1920s.

Development

The Alliance Aircraft Corp of Alliance, Ohio was formed in 1928 by a reorganisation of the Hess Aircraft Co. The firm designed the A-1 Argo as a sturdy two-seat open-cockpit biplane for operation by private pilot owners. The Warrior seven-cylinder engine was  designed and produced in the same factory at Alliance.

Operational history

Because of the difficult economic climate then existing, only 20 A-1 Argos were completed. Alliance Aircraft then went into bankruptcy in 1930, being reformed briefly as the Warrior Aeronautical Corporation before that organization also foundered later the same year.

Several Argo biplanes continued in operation by private owners until curtailment of civil flying in the USA in 1941. Two aircraft survived in mid-2009 of which, NC2M (N2M) was rebuilt to airworthy condition by Greg Herrick's Golden Wings Air Museum.

The Ohio History Connection displays a static A-1 Argo on the plaza level of the Ohio History Center. This particular aircraft was constructed in August 1929 by the Alliance Aircraft Corporation of Alliance, Ohio.

The Alliance Argo, N2M is the same plane as NC2M just the “C” was removed from the aircraft registration by the FAA for all aircraft after 1944. It is listed on the FAA Registry as serial number 108 built in 1929. This aircraft is now owned by Gregory Sean Messner in 100 Mile House BC with the registration of C-GSMA

Specifications

See also
Nemeth Parasol

References
Notes

Bibliography

External links

  Technical details and photograph of the Alliance Argo

1920s United States civil utility aircraft
Biplanes
Single-engined tractor aircraft
Aircraft first flown in 1929